Rong Zishan (born February 3, 2006) is a Chinese actor and model, best known for his portrayal of Dollar Zhang in Mountains May Depart and Zhu Chaoyang in The Bad Kids.

Personal life 
Rong was born on February 3, 2006, in Mianyang, Sichuan Province, and grew up in Suzhou, Jiangsu Province.

Career 
Early in the 2010s, Rong debuted in a KFC commercial.

In 2014, Rong contested in a children's runway model show and was the winner of the Suzhou Division.

He was cast in Jia Zhangke's 8th feature movie Mountains May Depart, which competed for the Palme d'Or at the 2015 Cannes Film Festival.

Rong has received popular recognition in China for his starring role as Zhu Chaoyang in the iQIYI Light On Series: The Bad Kids, aired in June 2020.

In October 2020, he won the “Newcomer Actor Award” at the 2nd Asian Content Awards of the Busan International Film Festival.

In December 2020, he was awarded, together with two other child actors Shi Pengyuan and Wang Shengdi, Upcoming Drama Actors of the Year for 2021 iQIYI Scream Night for their roles in The Bad Kids. Rong also picked up Upcoming New Film Actor of the Year Award for his role in Let Life Be Beautiful.

Filmography

Film

Television/Web series

Variety show

Music video appearances

Stage play

Discography

Single

Collaboration

Magazine modeling

Awards and nominations

References

External links
Rong Zishan at Douban
Rong Zishan at Weibo
Rong Zishan at IMDb

2006 births
Chinese male child actors
Chinese male film actors
Chinese male television actors
21st-century Chinese male actors
Male actors from Jiangsu
Living people